Beer and Pretzels is the second of five short films starring Ted Healy and His Stooges (Moe Howard, Larry Fine and Curly Howard) released by Metro-Goldwyn-Mayer on August 26, 1933. A musical-comedy film, the film also featured Bonnie Bonnell, Healy's girlfriend at the time.

Some footage of Healy and the Stooges from the unfinished MGM musical The March of Time was included in the film as well.

Plot
Ted Healy and his Stooges are entertainers. But because Healy is much more interested in women than he is in performing, they are thrown out of the Happy Hour Theatre. Unable to keep a job anywhere else, they are reduced to waiting tables at a high-class restaurant. This, of course, ends up being a disaster as the restaurant is thrown into chaos because of them. So, yet again, they are thrown back out on to the streets.

Cast

Credited
Ted Healy as himself
Moe Howard as Moe
Larry Fine as Larry
Curly Howard as Curly
Bonnie Bonnell as Bonny Latour

Uncredited
Edward Brophy as Theater Manager
Fred Malatesta as Restaurant Manager
Jack Smith as Singing Bartender
Martin Sperzel as Singing Bartender
Al Teeter as Singing Bartender

See also
The Three Stooges filmography

References

External links

Beer and Pretzels at Threestooges.net
Beer and Pretzels on Dailymotion

The Three Stooges films
American black-and-white films
1933 films
Metro-Goldwyn-Mayer short films
Films directed by Jack Cummings
1933 musical comedy films
American musical comedy films
1930s English-language films
1930s American films